was a Japanese football player. He played for Japan national team.

Club career
Sakai was born in Osaka Prefecture on June 10, 1909. He played for Kwangaku Club was consisted of his alma mater Kwansei Gakuin University players and graduates. He won 1929 and 1930 Emperor's Cup with Yukio Goto and so on at the club.

National team career
In May 1934, Sakai was selected Japan national team for 1934 Far Eastern Championship Games in Manila. At this competition, on May 13, he debuted against Dutch East Indies. He also played against Philippines and Republic of China. He played 3 games for Japan in 1934.

On June 3, 1996, Sakai died of a pneumonia in Nishinomiya at the age of 86.

National team statistics

References

External links
 
 Japan National Football Team Database

1909 births
1996 deaths
Kwansei Gakuin University alumni
Association football people from Osaka Prefecture
Japanese footballers
Japan international footballers
Deaths from pneumonia in Japan
Association football forwards